Sveltonectes (meaning "agile swimmer" in Greek) is an extinct genus of platypterygiine ophthalmosaurid ichthyosaurs known from Ul’yanovsk region, western Russia.

Etymology
Sveltonectes was named by Valentin Fischer, Edwige Masure, Maxim S. Arkhangelsky, and Pascal Godefroit in 2011 and the type species is Sveltonectes insolitus. The generic name is derived from sveltos, Greek for "agile", and nektes, Greek for "swimmer", and refers to its small size, streamlined skull, and powerful girdle musculature. The specific name is derived from insolitus, Latin for "unusual", in reference to the numerous unusual features of this ichthyosaur, as well as its unusual tooth morphology.

Description
Sveltonectes is known from the holotype IRSNB R269, an almost complete three-dimensionally preserved skeleton including a partial skull. It was collected in unnamed locality, in Ul’yanovsk, dating to the late Barremian stage of the early Cretaceous, about 126 million years ago. Another thunnosaur described from the same locality, by Bogolubow (1909), is "Ichthyosaurus" steleodon. It is a nomen dubium that is twice the size and more robust than Sveltonectes.

Like some other ophthalmosaurids, Sveltonectes has a projection on the nasal bone of the skull into the naris, a prefrontal forming part of the margin of the naris and a frontal forming part of the margin of the supratemporal fenestra. Sveltonectes is unique in that it has small, sharp teeth and numerous other peculiar features such as a very primitive prootic. The distinctive shape of these teeth suggest that it had a different feeding habit than other cretaceous ophthalmosaurids. Within the Ophthalmosauridae, Sveltonectes is most closely related to Aegirosaurus.

Phylogeny
The following cladogram shows a possible phylogenetic position of Sveltonectes in Ophthalmosauridae according to the analysis performed by Zverkov and Jacobs (2020).

See also

 List of ichthyosaurs
 Timeline of ichthyosaur research

References

Early Cretaceous ichthyosaurs
Fossil taxa described in 2011
Extinct animals of Russia
Ophthalmosauridae
Ichthyosauromorph genera